Northcutt is a surname originating as a toponymic surname in England.  It may be traced as far back to Devon in the year 1103 at Northcote manor, and may be translated in Old English as norð ‘north’ + cot ‘cottage’, ‘shelter’.

Northcote Manor 

A new manor was built beside the ruins of the original Northcote manor, which still exists today in North Devonshire, and the first officially recorded resident of the "north cottage" in Devonshire was one Nicholas de Northicote in the year 1199.

Spelling variations 

There are a wide variety of spelling variations on the 'Northcutt' surname that have evolved over time and geography.  These include:

 Northcote
 Northicote
 Norcott
 Norcot
 Norcutt
 Norcut
 Northcott
 Northcot
 Northcut
 Norkutt
 Norkett
 Narracott
 Northcult
 North Cult
 Northcutt

Noteworthy people 

 Adrian Northcut (1799–1869): A U.S. military General that fought in the War with Mexico, later chose the site where Altamont, Tennessee was built

 Frances ‘Poppy’ Northcutt (born 1943): U.S. mathematician and women's rights activist; responsible for calculating the return-to-Earth trajectory of Apollo 8 and the rescue trajectory of Apollo 13
 Sage Northcutt, a professional martial artist from Texas.

References 

English-language surnames
English toponymic surnames
Occupational surnames